Insula is the Latin word for "island" and may refer to:
Insula (Roman city), a block in a Roman city plan surrounded by four streets
Insula (building), a kind of apartment building in ancient Rome that provided housing for all but the elite
Ínsula Barataria, the governorship assigned to Sancho Panza as a prank in the novel Don Quixote
Insular cortex, a brain structure
 "Insula", a 2020 song by Moses Sumney from Græ